The Kansas City Cold Storage Company Building in Kansas City, Missouri is a building from 1922. It was listed on the National Register of Historic Places in 2005.

References

Commercial buildings completed in 1922
Buildings and structures in Kansas City, Missouri
Commercial buildings on the National Register of Historic Places in Missouri
National Register of Historic Places in Kansas City, Missouri